The 1999 Waveney Council election took place on 6 May 1999 to elect members of Waveney District Council in Suffolk, England. One third of the council was up for election and the Labour Party stayed in overall control of the council.

After the election, the composition of the council was:
Labour 38
Conservative 5
Liberal Democrat 3
Independent 2

Election result

Ward results

References

1999 English local elections
1999
20th century in Suffolk